Petracca is a surname. Notable people with the surname include:

Christian Petracca (born 1996), Australian rules footballer
Joseph Petracca (1913–1963), American novelist, short story writer, screenwriter, and television writer of Italian descent
Michael Petracca, American novelist